Happy Birthday, Gemini is a 1980 comedy-drama film written and directed by Richard Benner and starring Madeline Kahn, Rita Moreno, Robert Viharo, Alan Rosenberg, Sarah Holcomb, David Marshall Grant and Timothy Jenkins.  It is based on Albert Innaurato's play Gemini.

Plot

Set in the backyard of a blue-collar neighborhood early in South Philadelphia in the summer of 1973, the comedy-drama focuses on the 21st birthday celebration of Harvard student Francis Geminiani. In attendance are his divorced father Fran and Fran's widowed girlfriend Lucille, next-door neighbor Bunny Weinberger and her overweight son Herschel, and Francis' classmates, the wealthy WASP Hastings siblings; Judith (who seeks romance with Francis) and Randy (the object of Francis' unexpressed affection), who have arrived unexpectedly, much to their friend's dismay. All are dysfunctional to varying degrees, and the interactions among them provide the play with its comic and dramatic moments.

Cast
Madeline Kahn as Bunny Weinberger
Rita Moreno as Lucille Pompi
Robert Viharo as Nick Geminiani
Alan Rosenberg as Francis Geminiani
Sarah Holcomb as Judith Hastings
David Marshall Grant as Randy Hastings
Timothy Jenkins as Herschel Weinberger

Reception
Leonard Maltin awarded the film two stars.

References

External links
 
 

1980 films
1980 comedy-drama films
1980 LGBT-related films
American comedy-drama films
American films based on plays
American LGBT-related films
Films directed by Richard Benner
Films set in Philadelphia
Films shot in Philadelphia
United Artists films
1980s English-language films
1980s American films